The Great Emperor of the North Star, also called the Ziwei Emperor and the Beiji Emperor, is one of the highest sky deities and one of the Four Sovereigns of Taoism.

Chinese mythology 
The Ziwei Emperor resides in the middle of Heaven and assists the Jade Emperor in administrative duties of Heaven and Earth; Sun and Moon; four seasons and weather. He commands all deities of constellations, mountains, and rivers. He is the highest deity in charge of all the natural phenomenon in the universe. In Chinese culture and Chinese theology, the Ziwei Emperor is also the symbol of the emperor in the human world.

Notes

References

External links 
 道教文化资料库 
 星座探奇 
 神祇列傳-紫微大帝 

Four heavenly ministers
Chinese gods
Sky and weather gods
Deities in Taoism
Twenty-Four Protective Deities